Bar Kokhba weights are weights that were used during the Bar Kokhba revolt. Of the seven weights found so far, six weights originated from the antiquities market, and only one was found in an archeological survey.

Weights with Hebrew inscriptions
Four weights are from the Bar Kokhba period, on which the inscription is inscribed using the square Hebrew alphabet.

One lead weight was found in 1987 by Yair Zoran in an underground hideout in Horvat Alim near Beit Guvrin. The weight was published by Amos Kloner. Kloner mentioned in his article that an additional weight was bought in 1967 for the Eretz Israel Museum but was stolen in 1976. Until the weight was found in 1987, it was not known that this weight belonged to the Bar Kokhba period.

Weights with Paleo-Hebrew inscriptions
Three other weights originating in the antiquities market bear an inscription in the Paleo-Hebrew alphabet.

It is inscribed in the Ancient Hebrew alphabet: Shimon, Son of Kosba, Prince of Israel. It was purchased by Shlomo Moussaieff. In 2003, Deutsch published another weight weighing , with an inscription in the ancient Hebrew alphabet: Shimon, Prince of Israel.

References

2nd-century works
1987 archaeological discoveries
Jews and Judaism in the Roman Empire
Archaeological discoveries in Israel
Bar Kokhba revolt
Hebrew inscriptions